Jasper Aerents (born 18 December 1992) is a Belgian swimmer, who specialized in sprint freestyle events.

Career
He won two bronze medals, as a member of the Belgian swimming team, in the 4×50 m freestyle relay at the 2011 European Short Course Swimming Championships in Szczecin, Poland, and at the 2012 European Short Course Swimming Championships in Chartres, France. He also captured a silver medal in the 50 m freestyle at the 2010 European Junior Swimming Championships in Helsinki, Finland by a quarter of a second (0.25) behind Ukraine's Andriy Hovorov, in a personal best of 22.79. Aerents is a member of Regal Swimming Club in Belgium, and is coached and trained by Rik Valcke.

Aerents qualified for two swimming events at the 2012 Summer Olympics in London, by clearing a FINA B-standard entry time of 22.42 (50 m freestyle) from the Nancy Long Course Invitational in Nancy, France. He also teamed up with Dieter Dekoninck, Emmanuel Vanluchene, and Pieter Timmers in the 4 × 100 m freestyle relay. Swimming the second leg, Aerents recorded a split of 48.34, but the Belgian team rounded out the finale to last place in 3:14.40. In the 50 m freestyle, Aerents topped the fifth heat by 0.21 of a second ahead of China's Shi Yang in 22.43, just a 0.01-second deficit from his entry time and personal best. Aerents failed to advance into the semifinals, as he placed twenty-second out of 58 swimmers in the preliminaries.

References

External links
NBC Olympics Profile

1992 births
Living people
Olympic swimmers of Belgium
Swimmers at the 2012 Summer Olympics
Swimmers at the 2016 Summer Olympics
Belgian male freestyle swimmers
Sportspeople from Ghent
European Aquatics Championships medalists in swimming
20th-century Belgian people
21st-century Belgian people